The President's Truncheon is a ceremonial staff carried by the Sri Lanka Sinha Regiment that serves as the equivalent of and is carried as the Presidential colours having been modeled after the King's Truncheon. The President's Truncheon is carried along with the Regimental Truncheon which is the equivalent of Regimental colours.

See also 
 Rana Parashuwa

References

Sinha Regiment
Ceremonial weapons
Sri Lankan uniforms